Hendrik Albertus van den Eijnde or van den Eynde (29 November 1869 – 1 February 1939) was a Dutch sculptor. His work was part of the sculpture event in the art competition at the 1936 Summer Olympics.

Life and work
Hendrik van den Eijnde was born into a Catholic family in Haarlem. He initially worked as a frame maker and received drawing lessons from the sculptor  (1849–1919), in whose studio he worked for several years. He continued to develop through practice and study and was supported by Bart van Hove from 1902. In 1903 he founded the Haarlem Art Circle together with Henri Boot,  and Ben Kamp.

This workshop gave a great impulse to the revival of stone sculpture in the Netherlands, where stone carving could be learned again. Most of their work parallels the heyday of the Amsterdam School. He started his own studio in 1917 and was a construction sculptor at the Government Buildings Agency from 1917 to 1923. Van den Eijnde lived in Haarlem and Heemstede and worked there until 1922. He was active as a sculptor of monuments and facade decorations on houses and commercial buildings.

Works (selection) 
 Lieven de Key and Frans Hals, Houtbrug, Haarlem, Netherlands
 Four World Seas (1916), entrance sculptures of porphyry and terracotta, Scheepvaarthuis, Amsterdam
 Troelstranaald (1920), Kastanjestraat, Haarlem
 Entrance sculptures at broadcasting building A of Radio Kootwijk (1922), Radio Kootwijk, Apeldoorn
 Entrance sculptures (1924), Iepenlaan, Bloemendaal
 Statues and ornaments (1924), Hoofdpostkantoor, Utrecht
 Sculptures of lions (1925), later added to the Hoofdpostkantoor, Utrecht
 Coen, Daendels and Van Heutsz (1925), Netherlands Trading Society, building De Bazel, Vijzelstraat, Amsterdam
 Sculpture (1926), Magazijn de Bijenkorf, The Hague
 The Contemplation (1926), Sculpture second columbarium, Crematorium Westerveld
 Sculptures near the Grote Houtbrug, Haarlem
 Facade stone (1930), De Bijenkorf (Rotterdam), now in Woerden
 Learning through Play (1930), Julianaplein, Heemstede
 Pelican Nest (1932), relief (part of originally seven reliefs (titled Levensgang) that were designed for a now demolished office building of the insurance company OLVEH in The Hague), Laan van Rozenburg, Heemstede
 Entry of Saint Servatius and other reliefs (1932), from the pylons of the original Wilhelminabrug, Maastricht
 The Source (1936), Bronsteebrug, Heemstede
 Wilhelmina Memorial (1939), on the site where the Statue of Liberty now stands in Heemstede (the memorial was demolished by the occupying forces in 1941)

Gallery

References

1869 births
1939 deaths
20th-century Dutch sculptors
Dutch male sculptors
Olympic competitors in art competitions
People from Haarlem
20th-century Dutch male artists